Akdavletovo (Aqdäwlät) is a rural locality (a village) in Baishevsky Selsoviet, Zianchurinsky District, Bashkortostan, Russia. The population was 84 as of 2010. There are 3 streets.

Geography 
Akdavletovo is located 101 km southeast of Isyangulovo (the district's administrative centre) by road. Lukyanovsky is the nearest rural locality.

References 

Rural localities in Zianchurinsky District